Kideksha is a village (selo) in Seletskoye Rural Settlement, Suzdalsky District of Vladimir Oblast, Russia, located at the confluence of the Kamenka and Nerl Rivers,  east of Suzdal.

The settlement was founded before the Church of Boris and Gleb was built in 1152 by Yuri Dolgoruky.

Kideksha used to be a town, but, after having been destroyed during the Mongol invasion of Rus, it degraded to a small village.

Kideksha is a part of the Golden Ring of Russia and, since 1992, is one of Russia's World Heritage Sites (see White Monuments of Vladimir and Suzdal).

References

External links
 History and Photos of Kideksha

Rural localities in Suzdalsky District
Golden Ring of Russia